The 2022–23 season is the 145th season in the existence of Ipswich Town Football Club and the club's fourth consecutive season in League One. In addition to the league, they will also compete in the 2022–23 FA Cup, the 2022–23 EFL Cup and the 2022–23 EFL Trophy.

First-team squad

First-team coaching staff

Transfers

In

Out

Loans in

Loans out

New contracts

First-team

Academy

Pre-season and friendlies
In May 2022, Ipswich announced that the first-team would take part in a pre-season training camp at Loughborough University as part of the club's preparations for the 2022–23 season. On 31 May, Ipswich announced that they would play AFC Wimbledon in a pre-season friendly at Plough Lane on 16 July. The Tractor Boys confirmed their pre-season schedule on June 8, with friendly matches against Needham Market, West Ham United, Millwall and Southend United being added to the already confirmed fixture against AFC Wimbledon. Ipswich also played a behind closed doors friendly against Arsenal at the London club’s training ground on 2 July.

Competitions

Overall record

League One

League table

Results summary

Results by round

Matches

On 23 June, the league fixtures were announced.

FA Cup

Town were drawn away to Bracknell Town in the first round and at home to Buxton in the second round, Rotherham United in the third round and to Burnley in the fourth round.

EFL Cup

Ipswich were drawn at home to Colchester United in the first round.

EFL Trophy

On 20 June, the initial Group stage draw was made, grouping Ipswich Town with Cambridge United and Northampton Town. Three days later, Arsenal U21s joined Southern Group H. In the second round, Town were drawn against Portsmouth at home.

Squad statistics
As of match played 11 March 2023

Appearances and goals

|-
! colspan=14 style=background:#dcdcdc; text-align:center| Goalkeepers

|-
! colspan=14 style=background:#dcdcdc; text-align:center| Defenders

|-
! colspan=14 style=background:#dcdcdc; text-align:center| Midfielders

|-
! colspan=14 style=background:#dcdcdc; text-align:center| Forwards

|-
! colspan=14 style=background:#dcdcdc; text-align:center| Players transferred out during the season

|-

Goalscorers
As of match played 11 March 2023

Assists
As of match played 11 March 2023

Clean sheets
As of match played 11 March 2023

Disciplinary record
As of match played 11 March 2023

Captains
As of match played 11 March 2023

References

Ipswich Town
Ipswich Town F.C. seasons